Garry Wood (born 27 January 1988 in Aberdeen) is a Scottish footballer who plays for Brechin City.

He started his career at Elgin City before joining Inverness Caledonian Thistle in 2006. He was promoted from the  youth team in the summer of 2007, netting his first goal from the penalty spot in a pre-season friendly, before spending much of the season on loan at Montrose, where he scored seven goals in the Third Division.

Wood made his senior début for Inverness CT in the 2008–09 season. He scored his first senior goal against Arbroath in the League Cup and his first SPL goal against Celtic on 18 October 2008.

He was released by Inverness in the summer of 2009 following their relegation from the SPL, along with Iain Vigurs. They both joined Ross County soon after. Following two seasons at Ross County, Wood was released by the club. In January 2012, he was signed by Montrose.

On 22 May 2015, Wood signed for Formartine United

References

External links

Scottish footballers
Inverness Caledonian Thistle F.C. players
Elgin City F.C. players
Ross County F.C. players
Scottish Premier League players
Scottish Football League players
Living people
Association football forwards
Montrose F.C. players
Footballers from Aberdeen
1988 births
Peterhead F.C. players
Scottish Professional Football League players
Formartine United F.C. players
Highland Football League players